"Gracias por Pensar en Mi" (English: "Thank You for Thinking of Me") is the third single from Ricky Martin's first live album, MTV Unplugged (2006). Released on March 20, 2007, it was originally included on Martin's 1998 album Vuelve. "Gracias por Pensar en Mi" is a Spanish-language adaptation of Legião Urbana's song "A Via Láctea" from their album A Tempestade ou O Livro dos Dias 1996.

Chart performance
In the United States, the song reached number twenty-one on Billboards Latin Pop Airplay chart. It was also certified 4× Platinum by AMPROFON in Mexico for sales of over 400,000 downloads.

Formats and track listingsMexican digital single'
"Gracias por Pensar en Mi" – 4:38

Charts and certifications

Weekly charts

Certifications and sales

References

2007 singles
Ricky Martin songs
Spanish-language songs
Pop ballads
Songs written by Renato Russo
2006 songs
Songs written by Ricky Martin
Live singles

th:มายเลิฟ (เพลงเซลีน ดิออน)